Night on Earth is a British nature documentary series made for Netflix. The series is narrated by Samira Wiley and produced by Plimsoll Productions. The series follows animals that are active during the night using state of the art, low-light camera technology. All episodes were released on 29 January 2020.

Episodes

References

External links 

2020 British television series debuts
2020 British television series endings
2020s British documentary television series
British television documentaries
Documentary films about nature
English-language Netflix original programming
Netflix original documentary television series